Anum Bandey (born 22 March 1997) is a Pakistani swimmer. She currently swims in Barnet Copthall Swimming Club, north west London. In June 2012, she became the country's third female swimmer to be given a wild card for the Olympics.

Career

National
As of 31 December 2011, Bandey holds 2 national records.

International
In 2011, Bandey took part in the 14th FINA World Championships held in Shanghai, China where she set a new national record of 5 minutes 37.11 seconds in 400m individual medley. It was this performance which earned her entry into the London Olympics.

London Olympics
Bandey participated in the 400m individual medley event at these Games where she placed last in her heat. However, she created a new national record when she swam the event in 5:34.64.

Commonwealth Games
Bandey was selected to compete in the 2014 Commonwealth Games in Glasgow, UK

References

External links
 

1997 births
Living people
Pakistani female swimmers
Swimmers at the 2012 Summer Olympics
Olympic swimmers of Pakistan
Swimmers at the 2014 Commonwealth Games
Commonwealth Games competitors for Pakistan
21st-century Pakistani women